The Lunatic Asylums (Ireland) Act 1851 is an act of the Parliament of the United Kingdom. The act extended the Private Lunatic Asylums (Ireland) Act 1842, which would have expired at the end of that session of Parliament, until the end of the session of Parliament underway on 31 July 1855. The Act was superseded by the Lunacy (Ireland) Act 1867 and the Lunatic Asylums (Ireland) Act 1875.

References

  

United Kingdom Acts of Parliament 1851
1851 in British law
Irish law